Amy Welch (born 13 May 1985) is a journalist and news reporter for ITV news programme Granada Reports. She is originally from Frodsham, Cheshire and attended University of Central Lancashire and a new face of That's Lancashire from 8 June 2018.

References

English television journalists
English women journalists
ITV regional newsreaders and journalists
People from Frodsham
Living people
1985 births
British women television journalists